The women's 4 × 400 metres relay event at the 1974 British Commonwealth Games was held on 2 February at the Queen Elizabeth II Park in Christchurch, New Zealand. It was the first time this event was held for women at the Games with the 4 × 440 yards relay last being held in 1950.

Results

References

Athletics at the 1974 British Commonwealth Games
1974